Derek Godfrey (3 June 1924 – 18 June 1983) was an English actor, associated with the Royal Shakespeare Company from 1960, who also appeared in several films and BBC television dramatisations during the 1960s and 1970s.

Born in London, he performed with the Old Vic from 1956 where he played the roles of Iachimo and Enobarbus. With the Royal Shakespeare Company from 1960, he performed as Orsino, Hector, Petruchio and Malvolio. According to The Oxford Companion to Shakespeare, Godfrey "[w]ith his fine voice and often sardonic appearance...was a loyal company actor who revealed an intuitive grasp of the dark characters in Jacobean plays".

He created the role of Jack Gurney in Peter Barnes's play The Ruling Class. He also appeared in a number of films such as Hands of the Ripper and The Abominable Dr. Phibes, and the BBC television dramas The Pallisers (as Robert Kennedy), Warship (as Captain Edward Holt) and Nicholas Nickleby (1977, as Ralph Nickleby).

Family
Derek Godfrey was married to Australian actress Diana Fairfax; the couple had two daughters, Jules and Pippa.

Filmography

Notes

External links

1924 births
1983 deaths
English male film actors
English male television actors
English male stage actors
English male Shakespearean actors
Male actors from London
20th-century English male actors